The Petach Tikva Pioneers was an Israeli baseball team from Petah Tikva in the Israel Baseball League.

They finished the inaugural 2007 regular season in last place (9-32; .220), and lost to the Modi'in Miracle in the quarterfinals of the 2007 championship.

History

The name for the Pioneers was chosen in recognition that Petah Tikva was founded in 1878 by religious pioneers from Jerusalem, who were led by Yehoshua Stampfer, Yoel Moshe Salomon, Zerach Brant, and David Gutmann, as well as Lithuanian Rabbi Aryeh Leib Frumkin.

The first player selected by the Pioneers in the inaugural draft was Dominican outfielder Reynaldo Cruz, who later suffered a concussion and did not play for the rest of the season.

Ken Holtzman managed the Pioneers in the 2007 inaugural season of the Israel Baseball League, up until the last week of the season.  Holtzman in his major league career was the only pitcher since the 1880s to throw 2 no-hitters for the Cubs, and his 174 career victories are the most in the major leagues by a Jewish pitcher.  He also held the record for most pitching appearances by a Jewish pitcher until 1998.

Stadium
Located at the Yarkon Sports Complex in Petach Tikva.

2007 roster

Footnotes

External links
Official site of the Petach Tikva Pioneers

Baseball teams in Israel
Sport in Petah Tikva